Kimberly L. Wehle is a tenured law professor, writer, and legal contributor for ABC News and a former legal analyst for CBS News. She is an expert in civil procedure, administrative law, and the separation of powers. Wehle is also Counsel at the Washington, D.C.-based boutique law firm, Levy Firestone Muse. 

Wehle writes on democracy and the separation of powers, outsourcing government, and the federal administrative state. Before joining ABC News, Wehle was a contributor for the PBS-syndicated BBC World News and BBC World News America. She is also an op-Ed contributor for Politico, The Atlantic, The Hill, The Guardian and The Bulwark, and a regular commentator on NPR's Morning Edition. Wehle has authored three books, including How to Read the Constitution – and Why and What You Need to Know About Voting – and Why. Her latest book is How to Think Like a Lawyer—and Why: A Common-Sense Guide to Everyday Dilemmas. She is best known for her ability to demystify legal concepts.

Early life and education 
Wehle grew up in Buffalo, New York, the second of five children. During her childhood, she attended Catholic elementary schools and a non-sectarian all-girls school where she played lacrosse and explored her talent for the visual arts. Her mother, Betty Jane Wehle, was an amateur artist who started her own Montessori preschool in a Buffalo suburb in the early 1970s; she died in 2006. Her father, Richard E. Wehle, was a management consultant who died in 2015.

Wehle graduated high school from the Buffalo Seminary and went on to attend the University of Pennsylvania for one year before transferring to Cornell University, where she was a member of the Kappa Kappa Gamma sorority as well as the Phi Beta Kappa honor society. As an English major at Cornell, Wehle won a department award for the best honors thesis of her class. The paper was entitled The Vision of Flannery O'Connor. In the summer after her junior year, she attended the Leo Marchutz School of Art in Aix-en-Provence, France. Wehle was offered a full scholarship to remain at art school, but ultimately turned it down in order to complete her undergraduate degree at Cornell.

After graduating magna cum laude from Cornell in 1990, Wehle went on to attend the University of Michigan Law School. There, Wehle was an editor of the Michigan Law Review. She graduated with a J.D. cum laude in 1993.

Career 
Wehle began her career practicing law as a clerk to a federal judge, Hon. Charles R. Richey, of the U.S. District Court in Washington, D.C., then at the Federal Trade Commission; the Whitewater Investigation, where she worked with Independent Counsel Kenneth Starr and U.S. Supreme Court Justice Brett Kavanaugh; U.S. Attorney's Office; and then worked in private practice. She has also argued several cases before the United States Court of Appeals for the D.C. Circuit and other appellate courts.

As of August 2022, Wehle is a Visiting Professor and Fellow in Law and Government at American University's Washington College of Law, and a tenured Professor of Law at the University of Baltimore School of Law. She has previously taught at George Washington University Law School and the University of Oklahoma College of Law. Wehle specializes in the respective powers of the three branches of the federal government. She teaches courses in Civil Procedure, Administrative Law, Election Law, and Constitutional Law.

Wehle has written three books, and is, as of June 2022, a legal contributor for ABC News.  She began her career in legal journalism unexpectedly. In 2017, she came across a news article that referred to the President's pardon power under the Constitution as "absolute." This statement prompted her to write her first op-ed, published in The Baltimore Sun, to underscore that most of the Constitution is not black and white, but grey, and that even the pardon power is subject to checks and balances. From there, she began writing with greater frequency on issues of constitutional and legal significance for various journalistic outlets, including The Hill, The Bulwark, and, later, The LA Times, The Atlantic,  Politico and The Guardian. Based on Kim's written work, she is regularly invited to make media appearances on radio, podcasts, and TV. She has appeared regularly as a guest on BBC, CNN, MSNBC, NPR, Fox News, Al Jazeera, C-SPAN, PBS NewsHour, Peacock TV, NBC, Newsy, the Canadian Broadcasting Corporation, France 24, and on major networks in the Netherlands, Australia, and Ireland. Her current role for ABC News began with the hearings by the House Committee on January 6, 2021 and now spans other breaking legal news. During the Impeachment trial of Donald J. Trump, she provided in depth legal analysis for CBS, and appeared on Face the Nation with Margaret Brennan.  She hosts a periodic show called #SimplePolitics on Instagram.

Works 
 How to Read the Constitution--and Why, New York, NY : Harper, 2019. , "Not since perhaps the Nixon years have there been so many valid questions about the U.S. Constitution and its role in our lives—and so many perceived challenges to it. Kim Wehle's How to Read the Constitution—and Why provides essential, compelling reading on this glorious document. A must-read for this era." - Jake Tapper, CNN Anchor and Chief Washington Correspondent"[An] accessible treatise...Wehle elegantly translates the Constitution into layperson-friendly terms" - Publishers Weekly

 What You Need to Know About Voting--and Why, New York, NY : Harper, 2020. ,"Now, more than ever,  Americans are realizing that their votes count. Kim Wehle's excellent guide tells you everything you need to know about the laws governing our greatest right and privilege. A must-read, especially in an election year." - Norah O'Donnell, Anchor and Managing Editor, CBS Evening News''"Approachable and informative...What You Need to Know About Voting and Why is a clearly written resource for voters across the political spectrum, and is especially useful as we approach the 2020 presidential election." - Booklist

”How to Think Like a Lawyer and Why”, New York, NY : Harper, 2022. ISBN 0063067560 "Kim Wehle writes with clarity, verve, and a sense of style that combine to make legal thinking uniquely accessible to broad audiences.” Laurence Tribe, University Professor Emeritus, Harvard Law School

References

External links
Personal website

American legal scholars
Living people
Year of birth missing (living people)
Buffalo Seminary alumni
Cornell University alumni
University of Michigan Law School alumni
University of Baltimore faculty
George Washington University Law School faculty
University of Oklahoma faculty
CBS people
21st-century American non-fiction writers
21st-century American women writers
American legal writers
American women non-fiction writers
Writers from Buffalo, New York
American women legal scholars